Roaring Brook may refer to:

Streams
 Roaring Brook (Cruser Brook tributary), New Jersey, US
 Roaring Brook (Peakville, Beaver Kill tributary), New York, US
 Roaring Brook (Black River tributary), New York, US
 Roaring Brook (Roscoe, Beaver Kill tributary), New York, US
 Roaring Brook (Treadwell Creek tributary), New York, US
 Roaring Brook (East Kill tributary), New York, US
 Roaring Brook (Hunlock Creek tributary), Pennsylvania, US
 Roaring Brook (Lackawanna River tributary), Pennsylvania, US

Other places
 Roaring Brook Falls, a waterfall in Cheshire, Connecticut, US
 Roaring Brook sites, two archaeological sites in East Haddam, Connecticut, US
 Roaring Brook Township, Lackawanna County, Pennsylvania, US

Other uses
 Roaring Brook Press, an American imprint of Macmillan Publishers